Padmini is an upcoming Indian Malayalam-language biographical drama film written and directed by Susmesh Chandroth in his directorial debut. The film is about T. K. Padmini, one of the female painters from Kerala, with Anumol portraying her. It also stars Irshad, Sanju Sivram, Shaju Sreedhar, and Priyanandanan.

Synopsis 
Padmini is a biopic on the life of T. K. Padmini, a woman painter from India. Born in 1940, in a remote village in the Malabar District of Madras Presidency, she grew up in an orthodox environment where girls were never supposed to get higher education or jobs. Padmini had lost her father at a young age and was brought up by her uncle T. K. Divakara Menon, who recognized her artistic talent and encouraged her to pursue higher studies in Art. Fighting against many odds, she managed to join the Madras College of Arts and Crafts, where the renowned artist K. C. S. Panicker became her mentor. She married her classmate K. Damodaran, who encouraged and supported her in her artistic pursuits. Her works were acclaimed critically, and at a very young age, she came to be regarded as one of the most promising artists of her generation. She conducted exhibitions in the major cities of India and won various prestigious awards and captured the imagination of art lovers of the country in a short span of six or seven years, before her untimely death in 1969. At a time when ideas like feminism were not in vogue in the field of Indian art, Padmini was far ahead of her times with her bold depiction of the condition of women and her daring portrayal of the female body, breaking the barriers of orthodoxy.
The film narrates the story of Padmini’s artistic journey from a village girl breaking free from the constraints imposed by a conservative society to become a path-breaking artist of her times.

References

External links 
 

Upcoming films
Upcoming directorial debut films
Indian biographical drama films
Biographical films about painters
Cultural depictions of 20th-century painters
Cultural depictions of Indian women